Crambus girardellus, or Girard's grass-veneer moth, is a moth in the family Crambidae described by James Brackenridge Clemens in 1860. It is found in North America, including Alberta, Ontario, Quebec, Labrador, Maine, New Hampshire, Massachusetts, New York, Pennsylvania, Maryland, Ohio and Michigan.

The wingspan is 25–28 mm. The forewings are silvery white with a longitudinal orange discal stripe and a narrow brown terminal line. The hindwings are white. Adults are on wing in June and July.

The larvae feed on the roots of grass species.

References

Moths described in 1860
Crambini
Moths of North America